The Twannberg meteorite is a hexahedrite iron meteorite. It is the only meteorite of the IIG group found in Europe and the largest meteorite ever found in Switzerland.

Discovery and naming
The first fragment was found on 9 May 1984 in a barley field near Twann, after it had been ploughed (Twannberg I). Two additional fragments were found in an unnatural setting. One fragment (II) was found in 2000 in an attic in Twann and another (III) in 2005 in the Naturhistorisches Museum Bern, in a collection received from the Museum Schwab in Biel where it had been labeled as hematite around 1930. Twannberg IV, V and VI were found in the creek Twannbach.

The meteorite is named after Twannberg (from German: Twann mountain), a mountain that lies north of Twann.

The find location is a glacial till deposit. This paired with minerals found in the oxidized surface of the meteorite are an indicator that the meteorite fell on the Rhone glacier and was transported by it to Twann during the Würm ice age and then deposited there.

Mineralogy
The meteorite is composed of meteoric iron and schreibersite. The meteoric iron has 5.1% Nickel, and is all in the form of kamacite. The preatmospheric mass was estimated to be at least . The surface of the meteorite is covered in an oxidation layer.

Classification
The meteorite is classified as a member of group IIG.

See also
 Glossary of meteoritics

References

Meteorites found in Switzerland